Ruth Harris  (born 25 December 1958) is an American historian and academic. She has been Professor of Modern History at the University of Oxford since 2011 and a senior research fellow at All Souls College, Oxford, since 2016. Previously, she was a junior research fellow at St John's College, Oxford, from 1983 to 1987, an associate professor at Smith College from 1987 to 1990, and a fellow of New College, Oxford, between 1990 and 2016. She was awarded the Wolfson History Prize in 2010 for her book The Man on Devil's Island, a biography on Alfred Dreyfus.

Early life and education
Harris was born on 25 December 1958. She grew up in Philadelphia, Pennsylvania, United States. She studied at the University of Pennsylvania, graduating with a Bachelor of Arts (BA) degree and a Master of Arts (MA) degree. Having won a scholarship, she then studied at the University of Oxford and completed a Doctor of Philosophy (DPhil) degree in 1984. Her doctoral thesis was titled "Murders and madness: legal psychiatry and criminal anthropology in Paris, 1880-1910".

Academic career
Harris began her academic career as a junior research fellow at St John's College, Oxford, between 1983 and 1987. In 1987, she was shortlisted for a position at Christ Church, Oxford, but "decided to withdraw when she realised there was only one other woman fellow at the college". Instead, she returned to the United States and took up a position at Smith College, an all-women's liberal arts college in Northampton, Massachusetts. From 1987 to 1990, she was an associate professor at Smith College.

In 1990, Harris returned to England was elected a Fellow of New College, Oxford. At college level, she was a tutor in history. She also lectures in the Faculty of History, University of Oxford, and was granted a Title of Distinction in 2011 as Professor of Modern History. In 2016, she was elected a senior research fellow at All Souls College, Oxford.

In 2006, she delivered the George L. Mosse lectures at the University of Wisconsin, Madison. In 2017, delivered the George Macaulay Trevelyan lectures in Cambridge.

She is a member of the Editorial Board for Past & Present.

Personal life
In 1985, Harris married Iain Pears, an author. Together they have two sons.

Honours
In 1996, Harris was awarded a Guggenheim Fellowship for research in French History. She was awarded the 2010 Wolfson History Prize for her book, The Man on Devil's Island: Alfred Dreyfus and the Affair that Divided France. In 2011, she was elected a Fellow of the British Academy (FBA), the UK's national academy for the humanities and the social sciences. In February 2014, she was made an Honorary Fellow of St John's College, Oxford.

Selected works

References

1958 births
Living people
American women historians
20th-century American historians
21st-century American historians
Historians of Europe
Fellows of St John's College, Oxford
Smith College faculty
Fellows of New College, Oxford
Fellows of the British Academy
Writers from Philadelphia
University of Pennsylvania alumni
Alumni of the University of Oxford
Fellows of All Souls College, Oxford
Historians from Pennsylvania
21st-century American women writers
20th-century American women writers